Raymond Chesterton Shaw Severn (June 19, 1930 – November 3, 1994) was an American cricketer and child screen actor.

Raymond Severn was born in Johannesburg, the son of Dr. Clifford Brill Severn (1890-1981) and his South African wife Rachel (née Malherbe, 1897-1984). His parents emigrated from South Africa to Los Angeles after he was born. He had seven siblings who were all child actors: Venetia Severn, Clifford Severn, Yvonne Severn, Ernest Severn, Christopher Severn, William Severn and Winston Severn.

Like his brothers Cliff and Winston, Raymond Severn played for the U.S. national cricket team.

Raymond Severn played Paul Muni's son in the 1939 film We Are Not Alone. Raymond and his brothers Ernest and Christopher all acted in the 1943 film The Man from Down Under.

He died in Granada Hills in 1994.

Selected filmography
 The Story of Dr. Jenner (Short) (1939) - Little Jim Phipps
 We Are Not Alone (1939) - Gerald Newcome
 Foreign Correspondent (1940) - bit part
 The Reluctant Dragon (1941) - Baby Weems (voice only)
 On the Sunny Side (1942) - Boots, Kids Club member
 This Above All (1942) - Jackie Harvey
 A Yank at Eton (1942) - 'Inky' Weeld
 The Man from Down Under (1943) - 'Nipper' at age 12
 A Guy Named Joe (1943) - Cyril, English boy
 The Lodger (1944) - boy
 The Hour Before the Dawn (1944) - Jim as a boy
 The Suspect (1944) - Merridew

References

External links
 
 

American cricketers
American male child actors
American male film actors
1930 births
1994 deaths
People from Granada Hills, Los Angeles
20th-century American male actors
Cricketers from Johannesburg
Cricketers from Los Angeles